John Louis DiGaetani (born 1943) is a Professor of English at Hofstra University in Hempstead, New York.

He received his BA from the University of Illinois at Urbana-Champaign, his MA from Northern Illinois University, and his Ph.D. from the University of Wisconsin–Madison. DiGaetani's published works include studies on modern British literature, modern American literature, opera, and the connections between literature and music. He is also director of Hofstra's London Program.

He is the author of:
The Definitive Diva: The Life and Career of Maria Callas
Richard Wagner: New Light on a Musical Life
Wagner Outside the Ring: Essays on the Operas, Their Performance, and Their Connections with Other Arts
Stages of Struggle: Modern Playwrights and Their Psychological Inspirations
Penetrating Wagner's "Ring"
Richard Wagner and the Modern British Novel
An Invitation to the Opera
Puccini the Thinker
A Search for a Postmodern Theater: Interviews with Contemporary Playwrights
Inside the Ring: Essays on Wagner's Opera Cycle
Wagner and Suicide
A Companion to Pirandello Studies
Carlo Gozzi: A Life
Carlo Gozzi: Translations of "The Love of Three Oranges," "Turandot," and "The Snake Lady" with a Bio-Critical Introduction

References

External links
Staff biography: John L. DiGaetani, Hofstra University
John Louis DiGaetani on WorldCat
John L. DiGaetani books on Goodreads

Living people
20th-century American male writers
Hofstra University faculty
American academics of English literature
University of Illinois Urbana-Champaign alumni
Northern Illinois University alumni
University of Wisconsin–Madison alumni
1943 births
21st-century American male writers
20th-century American non-fiction writers
21st-century American non-fiction writers
American male non-fiction writers